Purcăreni may refer to several villages in Romania:

 Purcăreni, a village in Micești Commune, Argeș County
 Purcăreni, a village in Popeşti Commune, Argeș County
 Purcăreni, a village in Tărlungeni Commune, Braşov County